In enzymology, a cis-2-enoyl-CoA reductase (NADPH) is an enzyme that catalyzes the chemical reaction

acyl-CoA + NADP+  cis-2,3-dehydroacyl-CoA + NADPH + H+

Thus, the two substrates of this enzyme are acyl-CoA and NADP+, whereas its 3 products are cis-2,3-dehydroacyl-CoA, NADPH, and H+.

Nomenclature 

This enzyme belongs to the family of oxidoreductases, specifically those acting on the CH-CH group of donor with NAD+ or NADP+ as acceptor.  The systematic name of this enzyme class is acyl-CoA:NADP+ cis-2-oxidoreductase. Other names in common use include NADPH-dependent cis-enoyl-CoA reductase, reductase, cis-2-enoyl coenzyme A, cis-2-enoyl-coenzyme A reductase, and cis-2-enoyl-CoA reductase (NADPH).

References

Further reading 

 

EC 1.3.1
NADPH-dependent enzymes
Enzymes of unknown structure